This is a list of properties and districts listed on the National Register of Historic Places in Wisconsin. There are over 2,500 listed sites in Wisconsin.  Each of the state's 72 counties has at least one listing on the National Register.



Numbers of properties and districts
There are approximately 2,300 properties and districts listed on the National Register of Historic Places in Wisconsin. The numbers of properties and districts in the state or in any of its 72 counties are not directly reported by the National Register. Following are approximate tallies of current listings from lists of the specific properties and districts.

See also

 National Historic Preservation Act of 1966
 List of National Historic Landmarks in Wisconsin
 United States National Register of Historic Places listings
 List of bridges on the National Register of Historic Places in Wisconsin
 List of the oldest buildings in Wisconsin

References

 
Wisconsin